The Indonesian Army Aviation Center abbreviated Puspenerbad or simply Penerbad is the Army aviation unit of the Indonesian Army which has a means to support the combat mobility of the troops and also transport Infantrymen for Air assault operations. Penerbad is considered as an integral part mainly in cases of Air assault operations parallel to other Armament Corps of the Indonesian Army. Other additional tasks conducted by the unit can be implemented to support non-combat operations such as Search and rescue, Disaster relief, etc.

History

The Indonesian army aviation was born in 1959 -  the beginning of Guided Democracy - when the doctrine of Heliborne Troops or Air Mobile was being developed in various countries. In Sarawak during the Confrontatiion, the British SAS launched an air assault operation with Westland Wessex helicopter containing 16 personnel. During the Vietnam War, the United States Army operated in the form of Air Cavalry by the 1st Cavalry Division and Sky Soldiers by the 173rd Airborne Brigade using UH-1N Huey, UH-1 Iroquois and CH-47 Chinook helicopters supported by AH-1S attack helicopter Cobra and CH-54 Flying Crane. In Algeria, the French Army conducted a similar operation earlier with the Alouette III. The Soviet Union would only commence its air assault work in 1979 during the Soviet invasion of Afghanistan.

When the Chief of Staff of the Army made a Decree on the establishment of the Army Aviation Detachment on November 14, 1959 with the task of taking care of all activities concerning the field of organic army aviation, at that time Detasemen Penerbad did not have any aircraft at all. At that time the news was heard that Dr. A.K. Gani's DHC-2 Mk I Beaver plane which was being overhauled in Singapore will be sold, then the army immediately bought it.

As a follow up, some officers including Captain Binjamin Hadi, Captain Burhan Ali and Captain Sukartono were sent to the United States to attend an aviator training at the US Army Aviation School in Fort Rucker, Alabama in 1959 followed by a second batch in 1962 consisting of Lieutenant Colonel Juono, Captain Dolf Latumahina, Captain Sudewo, Captain Daud Natawiyoga, 1st Lt T.M.F. Worang and several other officers. It bore fruit when the Detachment later acquired two Cessna L-19 aircraft in the framework of the US Military Assistant Program in 1964, followed on by 15 Soviet-made Mil Mi-4 medium and 1 Mil Mi-6 heavy multipurpose helicopters, together with 2 American made Aero Commander 680FL utility aircraft in 1965. These purchases made Indonesia the one of the pioneer countries in Southeast Asia to have a strong army aviation force, and thus, the Detachment was transformed via Decision Kep/853/VII/1963 of the Chief of Staff of the Army on 22 July 1963 into the Army Aviation Service (Dispenerbad), which adopted its current name on 15 January 1966 (name readopted on 26 May 2000).

Mission 
The mission of Indonesian Army Aviation is to find, fix, and destroy the enemy through fire and maneuver; and to provide combat, combat support and combat service support in coordinated operations as an integral member of the combined arms team. On the modern battlefield, Indonesian Army Aviation, unlike the other members of the combined arms team, has the organic flexibility, versatility, and assets to fulfill a variety of maneuver, CS, CSS, roles and functions. These cover the spectrum of combined arms operations. Aviation can accomplish each of these roles—within the limits of finite assets and capabilities—during offensive or defensive operations and also for joint, combined, contingency, or special operations, as well as in civil-military operations such as disaster relief.

As a Central Executive Agency of the Army with greater importance, its Commander and Deputy Commander, filled up by officers of Major General and Brigadier General rank, respectively, are appointed and relieved from their positions by the Chief of Staff of the Army.  Training is imparted to all enlistees and graduate officers assigned at the Army Aviation Corps Training school in Semarang, where they receive specialized training in helicopter warfare.

Squadrons

Puspenerbad currently has five squadrons and one training center, which are:
11th Squadron/Assault (Semarang, Central Java)
12th Squadron/Assault (Waytuba, Lampung)
13th Squadron/Assault (Berau, East Kalimantan)
21st Squadron/Multipurpose (Pondok Cabe, South Tangerang, Banten)
31st Squadron/Assault (Semarang, Central Java)
Army Aviation Corps Training school (Pusdik Penerbad) located at Semarang, Central Java

Airbases
Army Airbase Ahmad Yani, at Semarang
Army Airbase Pondok Cabe, at South Tangerang
Army Airbase Gatot Subroto, at Way Kanan Regency, Lampung

Equipment

References

External links
 Video profile of Puspenerbad
 Official Website

Indonesian Army 
Military of Indonesia
Army aviation 
Military units and formations established in 1959
1959 establishments in Indonesia
Army aviation units and formations